Troy Pipkin Agnew (August 8, 1890 in Farmington, Missouri, USA – November 23, 1971 in Richmond County, Georgia) was a minor league baseball catcher and manager. His brother is Sam Agnew.

Playing career
Agnew began his playing career in 1914. He did not play in 1916, 1917 or 1918, and in his first year back in 1919 he hit only .144 in 222 at-bats. In ten minor league seasons, he hit above .250 only twice, in 1922 and 1924. He did not play in 1926, and 1927 was his final season. In May 1922, he bought his release from Augusta, with whom he had been playing, and headed to Okmulgee for his first managerial assignment.

Managerial career
Agnew often served as a player-manager.

Year-by-Year Managerial Record 

Agnew ran the Augusta franchise in the 1930s, buying the ballclub in 1929. Prior to owning it, he served as its business manager. His brother Sam managed. He would later buy the Palatka Azaleas and serve as the business manager of the Sumter Chicks. He served as vice-president of the South Atlantic League for a spell.

References

External links

1890 births
1971 deaths
Minor league baseball managers
People from Farmington, Missouri
Baseball players from Missouri
Baseball catchers